Esther Mwombe (born 10 April 1987) is a retired Kenyan female volleyball player.

She was part of the Kenya women's national volleyball team at the 2010 FIVB Volleyball Women's World Championship in Japan. She played with Kenya Prisons.

Clubs
  Kenya Prisons (2010)

References

1987 births
Living people
Kenyan women's volleyball players